Mudanjiang Hailang International Airport  is an airport serving the city of Mudanjiang in Heilongjiang Province, China.

Airlines and destinations

See also
List of airports in China
List of the busiest airports in China

References

Airports in Heilongjiang
Airports established in 1985